Mīr Sayyid Jalāl ad-Dīn an-Naqwī al-Bukhārī (1308-1384), better known as Jahāniyān Jahāngasht, was a Sufi saint from South Asia.

Biography

Mir Sayyid Makhdoom Jalaluddin Naqvi Al Bukhari was born into a Muslim family on 8th February 1308 AD (14 Shaban 707 AH). His father, Syed Ahmed Kabir, was the youngest son and chosen successor of Jalaluddin Surkh-Posh of Bukhara.

He was later given the title of Jahaniyan Jahangasht from which he gained prominence. He travelled to many countries, and visited Mecca 36 times in his life. He married the daughter of his half-uncle Sadruddin Muhammad Ghawth. 

He visited Hazrat Pandua, the first capital of the Bengal Sultanate, where he led the janazah of Alaul Haq Pandwi, the court scholar of Bengal. Some of his gifts to Bengal include a Jhanda which is preserved in the dargah of Jalaluddin Tabrizi in Pandua and a Qadam Rasul at the Qadam Rasul Mosque in Gaur. The nearby Jhan Jhaniya Mosque of the 16th-century is said to be named in his honour too. Every year, during the urs of Akhi Siraj Bengali, Jahangasht's jhanda is taken from Tabrizi's dargah to Akhi Siraj's mausoleum.

Legacy

His descendants use the surname Naqvi Bukhari, and belong to the Suhrawardi Saadat. Some of them migrated to Tando Jahania in Sindh creating a sizeable community, whilst others migrated to many other places within the subcontinent.

See also
 Tomb of Bibi Jawindi
 List of Sufis

References

Punjabi Sufi saints
1308 births
1384 deaths
Hashemite people
Shrines in Pakistan